The Men's 1 km time trial was held on 17 October 2015.

Results

References

Men's 1 km time trial
European Track Championships – Men's 1 km time trial